Helcogramma obtusirostris, the hotlips triplefin or shortsnout triplefin, is a triplefin blenny of the family Tripterygiidae, found from the Red Sea south to South Africa and east to the western Pacific, and the southeast Atlantic, around Ascension Island and St. Helena. It reaches a maximum length of 3.8 cm according to FishBase, but only 4 cm according to "Two Oceans".

References

obtusirostris
Fish described in 1871